Robert F. Sargent (August 26, 1923 – May 8, 2012) was a United States Coast Guard chief petty officer. A photographer's mate, he is best known for Into the Jaws of Death, a photograph he took of troops of Company E, 16th Infantry, 1st Infantry Division landing on Omaha Beach from a U.S. Coast Guard landing craft (from the U.S. Coast Guard-manned ) on D-Day.

References

1923 births
2012 deaths
War photographers
20th-century American photographers
United States Coast Guard personnel of World War II